The term Moor, derived from the ancient Mauri, is an exonym first used by Christian Europeans to designate the Muslim inhabitants of the Maghreb, the Iberian Peninsula, Sicily and Malta during the Middle Ages.

Moors are not a distinct or self-defined people. The 1911 Encyclopædia Britannica observed that the term had "no real ethnological value." Europeans of the Middle Ages and the early modern period variously applied the name to Arabs and North African Berbers, as well as Muslim Europeans.

The term has also been used in Europe in a broader, somewhat derogatory sense to refer to Muslims in general, especially those of Arab or Berber descent, whether living in Spain or North Africa. During the colonial era, the Portuguese introduced the names "Ceylon Moors" and "Indian Moors" in South Asia and Sri Lanka, and the Bengali Muslims were also called Moors. In the Philippines, the longstanding Muslim community, which predates the arrival of the Spanish, now self-identifies as the "Moro people", an exonym introduced by Spanish colonizers due to their Muslim faith.

In 711, troops mostly formed by Moors from northern Africa led the Umayyad conquest of Hispania. The Iberian Peninsula then came to be known in Classical Arabic as al-Andalus, which at its peak included most of Septimania and modern-day Spain and Portugal. In 827, the Moors occupied Mazara on Sicily, developing it as a port. They eventually went on to consolidate the rest of the island. Differences in religion and culture led to a centuries-long conflict with the Christian kingdoms of Europe, which tried to reclaim control of Muslim areas; this conflict was referred to as the Reconquista. In 1224, the Muslims were expelled from Sicily to the settlement of Lucera, which was destroyed by European Christians in 1300. The fall of Granada in 1492 marked the end of Muslim rule in Spain, although a Muslim minority persisted until their expulsion in 1609.

Name

Etymology

During the classical period, the Romans interacted with, and later conquered, parts of Mauretania, a state that covered modern northern Morocco, western Algeria, and the Spanish cities Ceuta and Melilla. The Berber tribes of the region were noted in the Classics as Mauri, which was subsequently rendered as "Moors" in English and in related variations in other European languages. Mauri (Μαῦροι) is recorded as the native name by Strabo in the early 1st century. This appellation was also adopted into Latin, whereas the Greek name for the tribe was Maurusii. The Moors were also mentioned by Tacitus as having revolted against the Roman Empire in 24 AD.

During the Latin Middle Ages, Mauri was used to refer to Berbers and Arabs in the coastal regions of Northwest Africa. The 16th century scholar Leo Africanus (c. 1494–1554) identified the Moors (Mauri) as the native Berber inhabitants of the former Roman Africa Province (Roman Africans). He described Moors as one of five main population groups on the continent alongside Egyptians, Abyssinians (Abassins), Arabians and Cafri (Cafates).

Modern meanings
In medieval Romance languages, variations of the Latin word for the Moors (for instance, Italian and Spanish: moro, French: maure, Portuguese: mouro, Romanian: maur) developed different applications and connotations. The term initially denoted a specific Berber people in western Libya, but the name acquired more general meaning during the medieval period, associated with "Muslim", similar to associations with "Saracens". During the context of the Crusades and the Reconquista, the term Moors included the derogatory suggestion of "infidels".

Apart from these historic associations and context, Moor and Moorish designate a specific ethnic group speaking Hassaniya Arabic. They inhabit Mauritania and parts of Algeria, Western Sahara, Tunisia, Morocco, Niger, and Mali. In Niger and Mali, these peoples are also known as the Azawagh Arabs, after the Azawagh region of the Sahara.

The authoritative dictionary of the Spanish language does not list any derogatory meaning for the word moro, a term generally referring to people of Maghrebian origin in particular or Muslims in general. Some authors have pointed out that in modern colloquial Spanish use of the term moro is derogatory for Moroccans in particular and Muslims in general.

In the Philippines, a former Spanish colony, many modern Filipinos call the large, local Muslim minority concentrated in Mindanao and other southern islands Moros. The word is a catch-all term, as Moro may come from several distinct ethno-linguistic groups such as the Maranao people. The term was introduced by Spanish colonisers, and has since been appropriated by Filipino Muslims as an endonym, with many self-identifying as members of the Bangsamoro "Moro Nation".

Moreno can mean "dark-skinned" in Spain, Portugal, Brazil, and the Philippines. Also in Spanish, morapio is a humorous name for "wine", especially that which has not been "baptized" or mixed with water, i.e., pure unadulterated wine. Among Spanish speakers, moro came to have a broader meaning, applied to both Filipino Moros from Mindanao, and the moriscos of Granada. Moro refers to all things dark, as in "Moor", moreno, etc. It was also used as a nickname; for instance, the Milanese Duke Ludovico Sforza was called Il Moro because of his dark complexion.

In Portugal, mouro (feminine, moura) may refer to supernatural beings known as enchanted moura, where "Moor" implies "alien" and "non-Christian". These beings were siren-like fairies with golden or reddish hair and a fair face. They were believed to have magical properties. From this root, the name moor is applied to unbaptized children, meaning not Christian. In Basque, mairu means moor and also refers to a mythical people.

Muslims located in South Asia were distinguished by the Portuguese historians into two groups: Mouros da Terra ("Moors of the Land") and the Mouros da Arabia/Mouros de Meca ("Moors from Arabia/Mecca" or "Paradesi Muslims"). The Mouros da Terra were either descendants of any native convert (mostly from any of the former lower or untouchable castes) to Islam or descendants of a marriage alliance between a Middle Eastern individual and an Indian woman.

Within the context of Portuguese colonization, in Sri Lanka (Portuguese Ceylon), Muslims of Arab origin are called Ceylon Moors, not to be confused with "Indian Moors" of Sri Lanka (see Sri Lankan Moors). Sri Lankan Moors (a combination of "Ceylon Moors" and "Indian Moors") make up 12% of the population. The Ceylon Moors (unlike the Indian Moors) are descendants of Arab traders who settled there in the mid-6th century. When the Portuguese arrived in the early 16th century, they labelled all the Muslims in the island as Moors as they saw some of them resembling the Moors in North Africa. The Sri Lankan government continues to identify the Muslims in Sri Lanka as "Sri Lankan Moors", sub-categorised into "Ceylon Moors" and "Indian Moors".

The Goan Muslims — a minority community who follow Islam in the western Indian coastal state of Goa — are commonly referred as Moir by Goan Catholics and Hindus. Moir is derived from the Portuguese word mouro ("Moor").

Moors of the Maghreb 

In the late 7th and early 8th centuries CE, the Islamic Umayyad Caliphate, established after the death of Muhammad, underwent a period of rapid growth. In 647 CE, 40,000 Arabs forced the Byzantine governor of northern Africa to submit and pay tribute, but failed to permanently occupy the region. After an interlude, during which the Muslims fought a civil war, the invasions resumed in 665, seizing Byzantine North Africa up to Bugia over the course of a series of campaigns, lasting until 689. A Byzantine counterattack largely expelled the Arabs but left the region vulnerable. Intermittent war over the inland provinces of North Africa continued for the next two decades. Further civil war delayed the continuation of further conquest, but an Arab assault took Carthage and held it against a Byzantine counterattack.

Although a Christian and pagan Berber rebellion pushed out the Arabs temporarily, the Romanized urban population preferred the Arabs to the Berbers and welcomed a renewed and final conquest that left northern Africa in Muslim hands by 698. Over the next decades, the Berber and urban populations of northern Africa gradually converted to Islam, although for separate reasons. The Arabic language was also adopted. Initially, the Arabs required only vassalage from the local inhabitants rather than assimilation, a process which took a considerable time.  The groups that inhabited the Maghreb following this process became known collectively as Moors. Although the Berbers would later expel the Arabs from the Maghreb and form temporarily independent states, that effort failed to dislodge the usage of the collective term.

Modern use in parts of the Maghreb 
The term has been applied at times to urban and coastal populations of the Maghreb, the term in these regions nowadays is rather used to denote the Arab-Berber populations (occasionally somewhat mixed-race) living in Western Sahara, and Hassaniya-speaking populations, mainly in Mauritania, Western Sahara, and Northwestern Mali.

Moors of Iberia

In 711 the Islamic Arabs and Moors of Berber descent in northern Africa crossed the Strait of Gibraltar onto the Iberian Peninsula, and in a series of raids they conquered Visigothic Christian Hispania. Their general, Tariq ibn Ziyad, brought most of Iberia under Islamic rule in an eight-year campaign. They continued northeast across the Pyrenees Mountains but were defeated by the Franks under Charles Martel at the Battle of Tours in 732.

The Maghreb fell into a civil war in 739 that lasted until 743 known as the Berber Revolt. The Berbers revolted against the Umayyads, putting an end to Eastern dominion over the Maghreb. Despite racial tensions, Arabs and Berbers intermarried frequently. A few years later, the Eastern branch of the Umayyad dynasty was dethroned by the Abbasids and the Umayyad Caliphate overthrown in the Abbasid revolution (746-750). Abd al-Rahman I, who was of Arab-Berber lineage, managed to evade the Abbasids and flee to the Maghreb and then Iberia, where he founded the Emirate of Córdoba and the Andalusian branch of the Umayyad dynasty. The Moors ruled northern Africa and Al-Andalus for several centuries thereafter. Ibn Hazm, the polymath, mentions that many of the Caliphs in the Umayyad Caliphate and the Caliphate of Córdoba were blond and had light eyes. Ibn Hazm mentions that he preferred blondes, and notes that there was much interest in blondes in al-Andalus amongst the rulers and regular Muslims:

The languages spoken in the parts of the Iberian Peninsula under Muslim rule were Andalusian Arabic and Mozarabic; they became extinct after the expulsion of the Moriscos, but Arabic language influence on the Spanish language can still be found today. The Muslims were resisted in parts of the Iberian Peninsula in areas of the northwest (such as Asturias, where they were defeated at the battle of Covadonga) and the largely Basque Country in the Pyrenees. Though the number of Moorish colonists was small, many native Iberian inhabitants converted to Islam. By 1000, according to Ronald Segal, some 5,000,000 of Iberia's 7,000,000 inhabitants, most of them descended from indigenous Iberian converts, were Muslim. There were also Sub-Saharan Africans who had been absorbed into al-Andalus to be used as soldiers and slaves. The Berber and Sub-Saharan African soldiers were known as "tangerines" because they were imported through Tangier.

The Caliphate of Córdoba collapsed in 1031 and the Islamic territory in Iberia fell under the rule of the Almohad Caliphate in 1153. This second stage was guided by a version of Islam that left behind the more tolerant practices of the past.  Al-Andalus broke up into a number of taifas (fiefs), which were partly consolidated under the Caliphate of Córdoba.

The Kingdom of Asturias, a small northwestern Christian Iberian kingdom, initiated the Reconquista ("Reconquest") soon after the Islamic conquest in the 8th century. Christian states based in the north and west slowly extended their power over the rest of Iberia. The Kingdom of Navarre, the Kingdom of Galicia, the Kingdom of León, the Kingdom of Portugal, the Kingdom of Aragon, the Marca Hispánica, and the Crown of Castile began a process of expansion and internal consolidation during the next several centuries under the flag of Reconquista. In 1212, a coalition of Christian kings under the leadership of Alfonso VIII of Castile drove the Muslims from Central Iberia. The Portuguese side of the Reconquista ended in 1249 with the conquest of the Algarve ( – al-Gharb) under Afonso III. He was the first Portuguese monarch to claim the title "King of Portugal and the Algarve".

The Moorish Kingdom of Granada continued for three more centuries in southern Iberia. On 2 January 1492, the leader of the last Muslim stronghold in Granada surrendered to the armies of a recently united Christian Spain (after the marriage of Ferdinand II of Aragón and Isabella I of Castile, the "Catholic Monarchs"). The Moorish inhabitants received no military aid or rescue from other Muslim nations. The remaining Jews were also forced to leave Spain, convert to Roman Catholic Christianity, or be killed for refusing to do so. In 1480, to exert social and religious control, Isabella and Ferdinand agreed to allow the Inquisition in Spain. The Muslim population of Granada rebelled in 1499. The revolt lasted until early 1501, giving the Castilian authorities an excuse to void the terms of the Treaty of Granada (1491). In 1501, Castilian authorities delivered an ultimatum to the Muslims of Granada: they could either convert to Christianity or be expelled.

The Inquisition was aimed mostly at Jews and Muslims who had overtly converted to Christianity but were thought to be practicing their faiths secretly. They were respectively called marranos and moriscos. However, in 1567 King Philip II directed Moriscos to give up their Arabic names and traditional dress, and prohibited the use of Arabic. In reaction, there was a Morisco uprising in the Alpujarras from 1568 to 1571. In the years from 1609 to 1614, the government expelled Moriscos. The historian Henri Lapeyre estimated that this affected 300,000 out of an estimated total of 8 million inhabitants.

Some Muslims converted to Christianity and remained permanently in Iberia. This is indicated by a "high mean proportion of ancestry from North African (10.6%)" that "attests to a high level of religious conversion (whether voluntary or enforced), driven by historical episodes of social and religious intolerance, that ultimately led to the integration of descendants." According to historian Richard A. Fletcher, "the number of Arabs who settled in Iberia was very small. 'Moorish' Iberia does at least have the merit of reminding us that the bulk of the invaders and settlers were Moors, i.e., Berbers from Algeria and Morocco."

In the meantime, Spanish and Portuguese expeditions westward from the New World spread Christianity to India, the Malay peninsula, Indonesia, and the Philippines. By 1521, the ships of Magellan had reached that island archipelago, which they named Las Islas Filipinas, after Philip II of Spain. In Mindanao, the Spaniards named the kris-bearing people as Moros or 'Moors'. Today this ethnic group in Mindanao, who are generally Filipino Muslim, are called "Moros".

Moors of Sicily

The first Muslim conquest of Sicily began in 827, though it was not until 902 that almost the entire island was in the control of the Aghlabids, with the exception of some minor strongholds in the rugged interior. During that period some parts of southern Italy fell under Muslim control, most notably the port city of Bari, which formed the Emirate of Bari from 847 to 871. In 909, the Aghlabids was replaced by the Isma'ili rulers of the Fatimid Caliphate. Four years later, the Fatimid governor was ousted from Palermo when the island declared its independence under Emir Ahmed ibn-Kohrob. The language spoken in Sicily under Muslim rule was Siculo-Arabic.

In 1038, a Byzantine army under George Maniakes crossed the strait of Messina. This army included a corps of Normans that saved the situation in the first clash against the Muslims from Messina. After another decisive victory in the summer of 1040, Maniaces halted his march to lay siege to Syracuse. Despite his success, Maniaces was removed from his position, and the subsequent Muslim counter-offensive reconquered all the cities captured by the Byzantines.

The Norman Robert Guiscard, son of Tancred, invaded Sicily in 1060. The island was split between three Arab emirs, and the Christian population in many parts of the island rose up against the ruling Muslims. One year later, Messina fell, and in 1072 Palermo was taken by the Normans. The loss of the cities, each with a splendid harbor, dealt a severe blow to Muslim power on the island. Eventually all of Sicily was taken. In 1091, Noto in the southern tip of Sicily and the island of Malta, the last Arab strongholds, fell to the Christians. Islamic authors noted the tolerance of the Norman kings of Sicily. Ali ibn al-Athir wrote: "They [the Muslims] were treated kindly, and they were protected, even against the Franks. Because of that, they had great love for King Roger."

The Muslim problem characterized Hohenstaufen rule in Sicily under Holy Roman Emperors Henry VI and his son, Frederick II. Many repressive measures were introduced by Frederick II to appease the popes, who were intolerant of Islam in the heart of Christendom. This resulted in a rebellion by Sicilian Muslims, which in turn triggered organized resistance and systematic reprisals and marked the final chapter of Islam in Sicily. The complete eviction of Muslims and the annihilation of Islam in Sicily was completed by the late 1240s when the final deportations to Lucera took place.

The remaining population of Sicilian Muslims converted to Catholicism due to the incentives put in place by Fredrich II. Some Muslims from Lucera would also later convert due to oppression on the mainland and had their property returned to them and returned to Sicily.

During the reigns of Frederick II as well as his son, Manfred, a large amount of Muslims were brought, as slaves, to farm lands and perform domestic labor. Enslaved persons in Sicily were not afforded the same privileges as the Muslims in mainland Italy. The trend of importing a considerable amount of slaves from the Muslim world did not stop with the Hohenstaufen but was amplified under the Aragonese and Spanish crowns, and was in fact continued until as late as 1838  The majority of which would also come receive the label 'Moors'

Architecture 

Moorish architecture is the articulated Islamic architecture of northern Africa and parts of Spain and Portugal, where the Moors were dominant between 711 and 1492. The best surviving examples of this architectural tradition are the Mosque–Cathedral of Córdoba and the Alhambra in Granada (mainly 1338–1390), as well as the Giralda in Seville (1184). Other notable examples include the ruined palace city of Medina Azahara (936–1010) and the Mosque of Cristo de la Luz, now a church, in Toledo, the Aljafería in Zaragoza and baths such as those at Ronda and Alhama de Granada.

In heraldry

Moors—or more frequently their heads, often crowned—appear with some frequency in medieval European heraldry, though less so since the Middle Ages. The term ascribed to them in Anglo-Norman blazon (the language of English heraldry) is maure, though they are also sometimes called moore, blackmoor, blackamoor or negro. Maures appear in European heraldry from at least as early as the 13th century, and some have been attested as early as the 11th century in Italy, where they have persisted in the local heraldry and vexillology well into modern times in Corsica and Sardinia.

Armigers bearing moors or moors' heads may have adopted them for any of several reasons, to include symbolizing military victories in the Crusades, as a pun on the bearer's name in the canting arms of Morese, Negri, Saraceni, etc., or in the case of Frederick II, possibly to demonstrate the reach of his empire. The arms of Pope Benedict XVI feature a moor's head, crowned and collared red, in reference to the arms of Freising, Germany.  In the case of Corsica and Sardinia, the blindfolded moors' heads in the four quarters have long been said to represent the four Moorish emirs who were defeated by Peter I of Aragon and Pamplona in the 11th century, the four moors' heads around a cross having been adopted to the arms of Aragon around 1281–1387, and Corsica and Sardinia having come under the dominion of the king of Aragon in 1297. In Corsica, the blindfolds were lifted to the brow in the 18th century as a way of expressing the island's newfound independence.

The use of Moors (and particularly their heads) as a heraldic symbol has been deprecated in modern North America.  For example, the College of Arms of the Society for Creative Anachronism urges applicants to use them delicately to avoid causing offence.

In popular culture 
 The title character in William Shakespeare's play Othello, and the derived title character in Verdi's opera Otello, is a Moor. A lesser-known Moorish character, Aaron, appears in Shakespeare's earlier tragedy Titus Andronicus.
 The Second Spanish Republic Spanish Civil War song ¡Ay Carmela! talks about the moors fighting alongside Francisco Franco
 Morgan Freeman's character Azeem in the 1991 film Robin Hood: Prince of Thieves is a Moor whom Robin Hood saves from prison.
 The 2009 documentary film Journey to Mecca follows the travels of the Moorish explorer Ibn Battuta from his native country of Morocco to Mecca for the Hajj in 1325.

Notable Moors 

Tariq ibn Ziyad, Moorish general who defeated the Visigoths and conquered Hispania in 711
Abd ar-Rahman I, founder of the Umayyad Emirate of Córdoba in 756; along with its succeeding Caliphate of Córdoba, the dynasty ruled Islamic Iberia for three centuries.
Ibn al-Qūṭiyya, Andalusian historian and grammarian.
Yahya al-Laithi, Andalusian scholar who introduced the Maliki school of jurisprudence in Al-Andalus.
Abbas ibn Firnas, 810–887, Berber inventor, poet, and scientist in the Emirate of Córdoba.
Maslama al-Majriti, died 1007, Andalusian writer believed to have been the author of the Encyclopedia of the Brethren of Purity and the Picatrix.
Al-Zahrawi (Abulcasis), Andalusian physician and surgeon whose work Al-Tasrif, published in 1000, remained influential for centuries.
Said Al-Andalusi, 1029–1070, Andalusian Qadi, historian, philosopher, mathematician and astronomer.
Abū Ishāq Ibrāhīm al-Zarqālī (Arzachel), 1029–1087, Andalusian astronomer and engineer who developed the equatorium and universal (latitude-independent) astrolabe and compiled a Zij later used as a basis for the Tables of Toledo.
Artephius, a writer to whom a number of alchemical texts are ascribed.
Ibn Bajjah (Avempace), died 1138, Andalusian physicist and polymath whose theory of motion, including the concept of a reaction force, influenced the development of classical mechanics.
Ibn Zuhr (Avenzoar), 1091–1161, Andalusian physician and polymath who discovered the existence of parasites and pioneered experimental surgery.
Muhammad al-Idrisi, circa 1100–1166, Moorish geographer and polymath who drew the Tabula Rogeriana, the most accurate world map in pre-modern times.
Ibn Tufail, circa 1105–1185, Arabic writer and polymath who wrote Hayy ibn Yaqdhan, a philosophical novel.
Averroes (Ibn Rushd), 1126–1198, classical Islamic philosopher and polymath who wrote The Incoherence of the Incoherence and several Aristotelian commentaries, and established the school of Averroism.
Ibn al-Baitar, died 1248, Andalusian botanist and pharmacist who compiled the most extensive pharmacopoeia and botanical compilation in pre-modern times.
Ibn Khaldun, who wrote about sociology, historiography and economics in the Muqaddimah in 1377.
Abū al-Hasan ibn Alī al-Qalasādī, 1412–1486, Moorish mathematician who helped popularize algebraic symbolism.
Leo Africanus, 1494–1554, Andalusian geographer, author and diplomat, who was captured by Spanish pirates and sold as a slave, but later baptized and freed.
Estevanico, also referred to as "Stephen the Moor", was an explorer in the service of Spain of what is now the southwest of the United States.
Ibn Battuta, an Islamic scholar and Moorish explorer who is generally considered one of the greatest travellers of all time.
Ibn Hazm, a Moorish polymath who was considered one of the leading thinkers of the Muslim World and is widely acknowledged as the father of Comparative religion studies.
Ibn Idhari, a Moorish historian who was the author of (Al-Bayan al-Mughrib) an important medieval text on the history of the Maghreb and Iberia.
Ibn Arabi, Andalusian Sufi mystic and philosopher.
Abu Bakr ibn al-Arabi, a judge and scholar of Maliki law from al-Andalus.

See also

Notes

...Hindu Kristao Moir sogle bhau- Hindus, Christians and Muslims are all brothers...

References

Bibliography
This section's bibliographical information is not fully provided. If you know these sources and can provide full information, you can help Wikipedia by completing it.

 Jan R. Carew. Rape of Paradise: Columbus and the birth of racism in America. Brooklyn, NY: A&B Books, c. 1994.
 David Brion Davis, "Slavery: White, Black, Muslim, Christian." New York Review of Books, vol. 48, #11 July 5, 2001. Do not have exact pages.
 Herodotus, The Histories
 Shomark O. Y. Keita, "Genetic Haplotypes in North Africa"
 Shomarka O. Y. Keita, "Studies of ancient crania from northern Africa." American Journal of Physical Anthropology 83:35-48 1990.
 Shomarka O. Y. Keita, "Further studies of crania from ancient northern Africa: an analysis of crania from First Dynasty Egyptian tombs, using multiple discriminant functions." American Journal of Physical Anthropology 87: 345–54, 1992.
 Shomarka O. Y. Keita, "Black Athena: race, Bernal and Snowden." Arethusa 26: 295–314, 1993.
 Bernard Lewis, "The Middle East".
 Bernard Lewis. The Muslim Discovery of Europe. NY: Norton, 1982. Also an article with the same title published in Bulletin of the School of Oriental and African Studies, University of London 20(1/3): 409–16, 1957.
 Bernard Lewis, "Race and Slavery in Islam".
 Stanley Lane-Poole, assisted by E. J. W. Gibb and Arthur Gilman. The Story of Turkey. NY: Putnam, 1888.
 Stanley Lane-Poole. The Story of the Barbary Corsairs. NY: Putnam,1890.
 Stanley Lane-Poole, The History of the Moors in Spain.
 J. A. (Joel Augustus) Rogers. Nature Knows No Color Line: research into the Negro ancestry in the white race. New York: 1952.
 Ronald Segal. Islam's Black Slaves: the other Black diaspora.  NY: Farrar Straus Giroux, 2001.
 Frank Snowden. Before Color Prejudice: the ancient view of blacks.  Cambridge, Massachusetts: Harvard Univ. Press, 1983.
 Frank Snowden. Blacks in antiquity: Ethiopians in the Greco-Roman experience. Cambridge, Massachusetts: Belknap Press of Harvard University Press, 1970.
 David M. Goldenberg. The Curse of Ham: race and slavery in early Judaism, Christianity, and Islam.  Princeton, NJ: Princeton University Press, c2003.
 Lucotte and Mercier, various genetic studies
 Eva Borreguero. "The Moors Are Coming, the Moors Are Coming! Encounters with Muslims in Contemporary Spain." p. 417-32 in Islam and Christian-Muslim Relations, 2006, vol. 17, no. 4, pp. 417–32.

External links

 "The Moors" by Ross Brann, published on New York University website.
 Secret Seal: On the image of the Blackamoor in European Heraldry, a PBS article.
 Encyclopedia - Britannica Online Encyclopedia (2006)
 Khalid Amine, Moroccan Shakespeare: From Moors to Moroccans. Paper presented at an International Conference Organized by The Postgraduate School of Critical Theory and Cultural Studies, University of Nottingham, and The British Council, Morocco, 12–14 April 2001.
 Africans in Medieval & Renaissance Art: The Moor's Head, Victoria and Albert Museum (n.d)
 Sean Cavazos-Kottke. Othello's Predecessors: Moors in Renaissance Popular Literature: (outline). Folger Shakespeare Library, 1998.

Medieval Portugal
Ifriqiya
Medieval Algeria
Medieval Morocco
Emirate of Sicily
History of Al-Andalus
Arabs
Arabs in Portugal
Arabs in Spain
Berber
Berbers in Portugal
Berbers in Spain